Tooleville is an unincorporated community in Tulare County, California. The 2010 United States census reported Tooleville's population was 339. For statistical purposes, the US Census Bureau has designated it a census-designated place (CDP).

Tooleville has the lowest per capita income ($3,711) of any CDP in California

Geography
According to the United States Census Bureau, the CDP covers an area of 0.07 square miles (0.17 km), all of it land.

History 
Tooleville narratives indicate that the Tool family, coming from Oklahoma in the Dust Bowl era, purchased a large parcel of land and sold portions of it to other Dust Bowl migrants.

Demographics
At the 2010 census Tooleville had a population of 339. The racial makeup of Tooleville was 145 (42.8%) White, 5 (1.5%) African American, 19 (5.6%) Native American, 8 (2.4%) Asian, 2 (0.6%) Pacific Islander, 148 (43.7%) from other races, and 12 (3.5%) from two or more races. Hispanic or Latino of any race were 279 people (82.3%).

The whole population lived in households, no one lived in non-institutionalized group quarters and no one was institutionalized.

There were 78 households, 44 (56.4%) had children under the age of 18 living in them, 40 (51.3%) were opposite-sex married couples living together, 16 (20.5%) had a female householder with no husband present, 9 (11.5%) had a male householder with no wife present.  There were 7 (9.0%) unmarried opposite-sex partnerships, and 0 (0%) same-sex married couples or partnerships. 10 households (12.8%) were one person and 5 (6.4%) had someone living alone who was 65 or older. The average household size was 4.35.  There were 65 families (83.3% of households); the average family size was 4.54.

The age distribution was 124 people (36.6%) under the age of 18, 58 people (17.1%) aged 18 to 24, 91 people (26.8%) aged 25 to 44, 47 people (13.9%) aged 45 to 64, and 19 people (5.6%) who were 65 or older.  The median age was 22.4 years. For every 100 females, there were 100.6 males.  For every 100 females age 18 and over, there were 106.7 males.

There were 82 housing units at an average density of 1,228.1 per square mile, of the occupied units 49 (62.8%) were owner-occupied and 29 (37.2%) were rented. The homeowner vacancy rate was 0%; the rental vacancy rate was 6.5%.  205 people (60.5% of the population) lived in owner-occupied housing units and 134 people (39.5%) lived in rental housing units.

Infrastructure 
Lacking a municipal water supply network, residents have used water that comes from two wells that are contaminated with nitrate and Coliform bacteria. Tooleville is one of many areas in the Central Valley plagued for decades by contaminated drinking water caused by chemical fertilizers, animal wastes, and pesticides that have infiltrated aquifers. In 1973, the county general plan deemed as having little or no authentic future and that by withholding major public facilities such as sewer and water systems, the community would enter a process of long term, natural decline.

Tooleville residents have sought water access through nearby Exeter, but Exeter officials declined to provide a connection to their water system for more than 20 years. In August 2021, the California State Water Resources Control Board sent a letter stating that the state would intervene if the city did create a consolidation plan within six months. Planning of a connection project started shortly thereafter, and the project is expected to take eight years to complete.

References

Census-designated places in Tulare County, California
Census-designated places in California